Rokantiškės is a village in the Vilnius District Municipality,  from Grigaičiai. National road KK101 passes through the village territory.

History 
Historical western part of the village was detached and integrated into Vilnius city to form Rokantiškės district of Vilnius.

Military camp 
on 24 August 2022 constructions works started for new military base in Rokantiškės. Project consists of army base with permanent living spaces for soldiers, medical buildings, leisure and sports complexes, military training rooms, garages for military vehicles. This will serve as headquarters for Duke Vaidotas Mechanised Infantry Brigade.

Demography

References 
 Lietuvos TSR administracinio-teritorinio suskirstymo žinynas, T. 2. – Vilnius: Mintis, 1976.

Villages in Vilnius County